Gareth Edwards (born 1947) was a Welsh rugby union player.

Gareth Edwards may also refer to:
Gareth Edwards (Berkshire cricketer) (born 1973), English cricketer
Gareth Edwards (director) (born 1975), British film director
Gareth Edwards (producer) (born 1965), British radio and television writer and producer
Gareth Edwards (Welsh cricketer) (born 1976), Welsh cricketer

See also
Gary Edwards (disambiguation)
Gareth Evans (disambiguation)